San Ildefonso, officially the Municipality of San Ildefonso, is a 5th class municipality in the province of Ilocos Sur, Philippines. According to the 2020 census, it has a population of 8,190 people.

Etymology
The town got its name from Saint Ildephonsus.

History
San Ildefonso, like many other places in the provinces at the beginning of the Spanish Regime, did not have a name. Sometime in 1625, its inhabitants decided to give it a name, but nothing came out after more than five hours of discussions. So while thinking of a name, they decided to go fishing for a week. And while preparing to go fishing, they saw a box floating not far from shore. Wading to reach the box and carrying it ashore, they opened the box to find a statue of Saint Ildephonsus. The young women of the place carried the statue to the center of the village, where it was enshrined in a small hut for many years.  He became the patron saint of the municipality, and his name was decided to become the name of the fledgling municipality.

San Ildefonso was a former rancheria of Bantay before it became a municipality, but because of its size it was annexed to Santo Domingo as a barrio.  In 1921, Assemblyman (and future Philippine president) Elpidio Quirino worked to convert San Ildefonso into a municipality again.

200th Anniversary of Basi Revolt
On September 28, 2007, San Ildefonso officials (Governor Deogracias Victor Savellano and Rep. Ronald Singson) commemorated the Basi Revolt.  Recently, the Sangguniang Bayan of San Ildefonso approved a resolution declaring September 16 as a non-working holiday and named the old road in Barangay Gongogong as Ambaristo street in honor of Pedro Ambaristo, leader of the Basi Revolt. Mayor Christian Purisima enrolled basi as their entry into the  “One Town; One Product” (OTOP) program of Governor Savellano.

Geography

Barangays
San Ildefonso is politically subdivided into 15 barangays. These barangays are headed by elected officials: Barangay Captain, Barangay Council, whose members are called Barangay Councilors. All are elected every three years.

 Arnap
 Bahet
 Belen
 Bungro
 Busiing Sur
 Busiing Norte
 Dongalo
 Gongogong
 Iboy
 Kinamantirisan
 Otol-Patac
 Poblacion East
 Poblacion West
 Sagneb
 Sagsagat

Climate

Demographics

In the 2020 census, San Ildefonso had a population of 8,190.

Economy 

The town is rich in rice, corn, sugarcane, malunggay, katuday & fruit-bearing trees such as star apple, chico, mango, camachile & atis.  Its main product is basi, a wine made from fermented sugarcane juice; as well as cane vinegar.  They also make nutritious ice cream made up of vegetables in Barangay Bungro, and is being popularized by the town's local government.

Government
San Ildefonso, belonging to the first congressional district of the province of Ilocos Sur, is governed by a mayor designated as its local chief executive and by a municipal council as its legislative body in accordance with the Local Government Code. The mayor, vice mayor, and the councilors are elected directly by the people through an election which is being held every three years.

Elected officials

Education
 Belen National High School
 San Ildefonso Central School
 Bungro Elementary School
 Sagsagat Elementary School
 Busiing Elementary School
Philippine Science High School - Ilocos Region Campus
 Day Care Centers (different barangays)

References

External links
Pasyalang Ilocos Sur
Philippine Standard Geographic Code
Philippine Census Information
Local Governance Performance Management System

Municipalities of Ilocos Sur